Chestnut Hill (Paxinosa Ridge, College Hill, Lafayette Hill or Mount Lafayette) is a low mountain in Northampton County, Pennsylvania. The neighborhood within Forks Township on the northern slopes of the mountain is known as Chestnut Hill.

Chestnut Hill overlooks the Delaware River, and, with Marble Mountain on the New Jersey side, forms Weygadt Gap or the "Little Water Gap". The cliff overlooking Weygadt Gap is known as St. Anthony's Nose. Chestnut Hill adjoins the Great Appalachian Valley to the north at Frost Hollow.

It is part of the Reading Prong of the Appalachian Mountains.

Toponymy 
Chestnut Hill is named for the American chestnut tree, once prevalent in the area.

References 

Mountains of Northampton County, Pennsylvania
Mountains of Pennsylvania